Bedside is a 1934 American pre-Code drama film starring Warren William, Jean Muir and Allen Jenkins.

Plot
A man passes himself off as a doctor.

Cast
 Warren William as Bob Brown
 Jean Muir as Caroline Grant
 Allen Jenkins	as Sam Sparks
 David Landau as Smith
 Katharine Sergava (Kathryn Sergava) as Mimi Maritza
 Henry O'Neill as Dr. William Chester
 Donald Meek as Dr. George Wiley
 Renee Whitney as Mme. Varsova
 Walter Walker as Dr. Michaels
 Marjorie Lytell as Patient with Sprained Ankle
 Frederick Burton as Hospital Superintendent
 Philip Faversham as Intern Attending Caroline (as Phillip Faversham)
 Louise Beavers as Pansy
 Earle Foxe as Joe

Reception
The New York Times critic wrote that "the story of 'Bedside' is not quite as predictable a thing as it sounds, but its deviations from the formula are too wild-eyed to be classed as dramatic virtues."

References

External links

American black-and-white films
American drama films
Films directed by Robert Florey
First National Pictures films
1934 drama films
1934 films
Warner Bros. films
1930s American films
Films about medical malpractice
Films scored by Bernhard Kaun
Films about physicians